Lindholme may refer to:-

 Lindholme, South Yorkshire, in the Metropolitan Borough of Doncaster, England
 RAF Lindholme, a World War II bomber station
 HM Prison Lindholme, a prison and Immigrant Removal Centre on the site of the former RAF Lindholme

See also
 Lindholm (disambiguation)
 Lindholmen (disambiguation)
 Lindholme Gear, a type of air sea rescue apparatus